Al-Hadath literally "The Event" is an Arab news interactive channel focusing on political events in the Arab region. It is available on the British Freeview service via the Vision TV streaming service and from 28 March 2022, it joined Al Arabiya on Freeview channel 273.

Programmes 

 Egyptian street
 Face2face
 Al-Hadath eye
 Points-of-views

See also
Al Arabiya

References

External links

News media in Saudi Arabia